Roger Dean Stadium (officially known as Roger Dean Chevrolet Stadium) is a baseball stadium located in the Abacoa community of the town of Jupiter, Florida. The stadium was built in 1998, holds 6,871 people, and features luxury sky-box seating, two levels of permanent seating, parking and concessions. The Roger Dean Stadium Complex is the only stadium in the country to host four minor league teams: the Jupiter Hammerheads and Palm Beach Cardinals of the Florida State League, and the Florida Complex League Marlins and Florida Complex League Cardinals of the Rookie-level Florida Complex League.

Roger Dean Stadium is one of only two stadiums in Florida to host two Major League Baseball teams annually for spring training: the Miami Marlins and St. Louis Cardinals (the other is The Ballpark of the Palm Beaches, which opened in 2017, hosting the Washington Nationals and Houston Astros).  In both venues, the teams share the main stadium where the games are played.  However, the teams have their own practice fields, outdoor batting cages, several pitching mounds, and state-of-the-art conditioning rooms.

History
Through 2002 the Montreal Expos shared the stadium with the Cardinals, until they swapped with the Marlins as part of the Marlins sale to Jeffrey Loria. The Expos, now known as the Washington Nationals, then moved to Space Coast Stadium in Viera.

Roger Dean Stadium was badly damaged in 2004 by hurricanes Frances and Jeanne.

Cliff Politte threw the first pitch in the stadium's history in spring training, 1998.

In September 2012, the stadium hosted a qualifying round for the 2013 World Baseball Classic.  Spain, France, Israel, and South Africa took part in the qualifier.

Roger Dean Stadium hosted the Florida State League All-Star Game in 2019.

In February 2022, Roger Dean Stadium was the site of negotiations between Major League Baseball and the players' union as part of the 2021–22 Major League Baseball lockout.

References

External links
 Roger Dean Stadium Official website
 Stadium Fact Sheet
 Miami Marlins Spring training ballpark
 St. Louis Cardinals Spring training ballpark
 Roger Dean Stadium Minor League Ball Parks
 Roger Dean Stadium Views – Ball Parks of the Minor Leagues

Minor league baseball venues
Spring training ballparks
Grapefruit League venues
Miami Marlins spring training venues
Montreal Expos spring training venues
St. Louis Cardinals spring training venues
Baseball venues in Florida
Sports venues completed in 1998
Jupiter, Florida
Sports venues in Palm Beach County, Florida
NAIA World Series venues
1998 establishments in Florida
Florida Complex League ballparks
Florida State League ballparks